Rotavirus gastroenteritis is a major cause of severe diarrhoea among infants and young children globally. It is caused by rotavirus, a genus of double-stranded RNA virus in the family Reoviridae. The diarrhea tends to be watery and is frequently accompanied by fever, vomiting and abdominal pain. By the age of five, nearly every child in the world has been infected with rotavirus at least once. However, with each infection, immunity develops, and subsequent infections are less severe; adults are rarely affected.  There are five species of this virus, referred to as A, B, C, D, and E. Rotavirus A, the most common, causes more than 90% of infections in humans.

The virus is transmitted by the faecal-oral route. It infects and damages the cells that line the small intestine and causes gastroenteritis (which is often called "stomach flu" despite having no relation to influenza). Although rotavirus was discovered in 1973 and accounts for up to 50% of hospitalisations for severe diarrhoea in infants and children, its importance is still not widely known within the public health community, particularly in developing countries. In addition to its impact on human health, rotavirus also infects animals, and is a pathogen of livestock.

Rotavirus is usually an easily managed disease of childhood, but worldwide nearly 500,000 children under five years of age still die from rotavirus infection each year and almost two million more become severely ill. In the United States, before initiation of  the rotavirus vaccination programme, rotavirus caused about 2.7 million cases of severe gastroenteritis in children, almost 60,000 hospitalisations, and around 37 deaths each year. Public health campaigns to combat rotavirus focus on providing oral rehydration therapy for infected children and vaccination to prevent the disease. The incidence and severity of rotavirus infections has declined significantly in countries that have added rotavirus vaccine to their routine childhood immunisation policies.

Signs and symptoms
Rotavirus gastroenteritis is a mild to severe disease characterised by vomiting, watery diarrhoea, and low-grade fever. Once a child is infected by the virus, there is an incubation period of about two days before symptoms appear. Symptoms often start with vomiting followed by profuse diarrhoea after at least four days. Dehydration is more common in rotavirus infection than in most of those caused by bacterial pathogens, and is the most common cause of death related to rotavirus infection.

Rotavirus A infections can occur throughout life: the first usually produces symptoms, but subsequent infections are typically mild or asymptomatic, as the immune system provides some protection. Consequently, symptomatic infection rates are highest in children under two years of age and decrease progressively towards 45 years of age. Infection in newborn children, although common, is often associated with mild or asymptomatic disease; the most severe symptoms tend to occur in children six months to two years of age, the elderly, and those with  compromised or absent immune system functions. Due to immunity acquired in childhood, most adults are not susceptible to rotavirus; gastroenteritis in adults usually has a cause other than rotavirus, but asymptomatic infections in adults may maintain the transmission of infection in the community.

Virology

Transmission
Rotavirus is transmitted by the faecal-oral route, via contact with contaminated hands, surfaces and objects, and possibly by the respiratory route. The faeces of an infected person can contain more than 10 trillion infectious particles per gram;  fewer than 100 of these are required to transmit infection to another person.

Rotaviruses are stable in the environment and have been found in estuary samples at levels as high as 1–5 infectious particles per US gallon. Sanitary measures adequate for eliminating bacteria and parasites seem to be ineffective in control of rotavirus, as the incidence of rotavirus infection in countries with high and low health standards is similar.

Types
There are five species of rotavirus, referred to as A, B, C, D and E. Humans are mostly infected by species A. All five species cause disease in other animals.
Within rotavirus A there are different strains, called serotypes. As with influenza virus, a dual classification system is used based on two  proteins on the surface of the virus. The glycoprotein VP7 defines the  G serotypes and the protease-sensitive protein VP4 defines P serotypes. Because the two genes that determine G-types and P-types can be passed on separately to progeny viruses, different combinations are found.

Replication
Rotaviruses replicate mainly in the gut, and infect enterocytes of the villi of the small intestine, leading to structural and functional changes of the epithelium. The triple protein coats make them resistant to the acidic pH of the stomach and the digestive enzymes in the gut.

The virus enter cells by receptor mediated endocytosis and form a vesicle known as an endosome. Proteins in the third layer (VP7 and the VP4 spike) disrupt the membrane of the endosome, creating a difference in the calcium concentration. This causes the breakdown of VP7 trimers into single protein subunits, leaving the VP2 and VP6 protein coats around the viral dsRNA, forming a double-layered particle (DLP).

The eleven dsRNA strands remain within the protection of the two protein shells and the viral RNA-dependent RNA polymerasecreates mRNA transcripts of the double-stranded viral genome. By remaining in the core, the viral RNA evades innate host immune responses called RNA interference that are triggered by the presence of double-stranded RNA.

During the infection, rotavirus produces mRNA for both protein biosynthesis and gene replication. Most of the rotavirus proteins accumulate in viroplasm, where the RNA is replicated and the DLPs are assembled. Viroplasm is formed around the cell nucleus as early as two hours after virus infection, and consists of viral factories thought to be made by two viral nonstructural proteins: NSP5 and NSP2. Inhibition of NSP5 by RNA interference results in a sharp decrease in rotavirus replication. The DLPs migrate to the endoplasmic reticulum where they obtain their third, outer layer (formed by VP7 and VP4). The progeny viruses are released from the cell by lysis.

Pathophysiology

The diarrhoea is caused by multiple activities of the virus. Malabsorption occurs because of the destruction of gut cells called enterocytes. The toxic rotavirus protein NSP4 induces age- and calcium ion-dependent chloride secretion, disrupts SGLT1 transporter-mediated reabsorption of water, apparently reduces activity of brush-border membrane disaccharidases, and possibly activates the calcium ion-dependent secretory reflexes of the enteric nervous system. Healthy enterocytes secrete lactase into the small intestine; milk intolerance due to lactase deficiency is a symptom of rotavirus infection, which can persist for weeks. A recurrence of mild diarrhoea often follows the reintroduction of milk into the child's diet, due to bacterial fermentation of the disaccharide lactose in the gut.

Diagnosis
Diagnosis of infection with rotavirus normally follows diagnosis of gastroenteritis as the cause of severe diarrhoea. Most children admitted to hospital with gastroenteritis are tested for 
Other methods, such as electron microscopy and PCR, are used in research laboratories. Reverse transcription-polymerase chain reaction (RT-PCR) can detect and identify all species and serotypes of human rotavirus.

Prevention
Because improved sanitation does not decrease the prevalence of rotaviral disease, and the rate of hospitalisations remains high, despite the use of oral rehydrating medicines, the primary public health intervention is vaccination. Two rotavirus vaccines against Rotavirus A infection are safe and effective in children: Rotarix by GlaxoSmithKline and RotaTeq by Merck. Both are taken orally and contain attenuated live virus.

Rotavirus vaccines are licensed in more than 100 countries, but only 17 countries have introduced routine rotavirus vaccination. Following the introduction of routine rotavirus vaccination in the US in 2006, the health burden of rotavirus gastroenteritis "rapidly and dramatically reduced" despite lower coverage levels compared to other routine infant immunizations. Clinical trials of the Rotarix  rotavirus vaccine in South Africa and Malawi, found that the vaccine significantly reduced severe diarrhoea episodes caused by rotavirus, and that the infection was preventable by vaccination. Additional rotavirus vaccines are under development. The World Health Organization(WHO) recommends that rotavirus vaccine be included in all national immunisation programmes. The incidence and severity of rotavirus infections has declined significantly in countries that have acted on this recommendation.

The Program aims to reduce child morbidity and mortality from diarrhoeal disease by making a vaccine against rotavirus available for use in developing countries.

Treatment
Treatment of acute rotavirus infection is nonspecific and involves management of symptoms and, most importantly, maintenance of hydration. If untreated, children can die from the resulting severe dehydration.  Depending on the severity of diarrhea, treatment consists of oral rehydration, during which the child is given extra water to drink that contains small amounts of salt and sugar.  Some infections are serious enough to warrant hospitalisation where fluids are given by intravenous drip or nasogastric tube, and the child's electrolytes and blood sugar are monitored. Antibiotics are not recommended.

Prognosis
Rotavirus infections rarely cause other complications and for a well managed child the prognosis is excellent.

Epidemiology

Rotavirus A, which accounts for more than 90% of rotavirus gastroenteritis in humans, is endemic worldwide. Each year rotavirus causes millions of cases of diarrhoea in developing countries, almost 2 million resulting in hospitalisation and an estimated 453,000 resulting in the death of a child younger than five. This is about 40 per cent of all hospital admissions related to diarrhea in children under five worldwide.

In the United States alone—before initiation of the rotavirus vaccination programme—over 2.7 million cases of rotavirus gastroenteritis occurred annually, 60,000 children were hospitalised and around 37 died from the results of the infection. The major role of rotavirus in causing diarrhoea is not widely recognised within the public health community, particularly in developing countries. Almost every child has been infected with rotavirus by age five. It is the leading single cause of severe diarrhoea among infants and children, being responsible for about 20% of cases, and accounts for 50% of the cases requiring hospitalisation. Rotavirus causes 37% of deaths attributable to diarrhoea and 5% of all deaths in children younger than five. Boys are twice as likely as girls to be admitted to hospital.
Rotavirus infections occur primarily during cool, dry seasons. The number attributable to food contamination is unknown.

Outbreaks of rotavirus A diarrhoea are common among hospitalised infants, young children attending day care centres, and elderly people in nursing homes. An outbreak caused by contaminated municipal water occurred in Colorado in 1981.
During 2005, the largest recorded epidemic of diarrhoea occurred in Nicaragua. This unusually large and severe outbreak was associated with mutations in the rotavirus A genome, possibly helping the virus escape the prevalent immunity in the population. A similar large outbreak occurred in Brazil in 1977.

Rotavirus B, also called adult diarrhoea rotavirus or ADRV, has caused major epidemics of severe diarrhoea affecting thousands of people of all ages in China. These epidemics occurred as a result of sewage contamination of drinking water. Rotavirus B infections also occurred in India in 1998; the causative strain was named CAL. Unlike ADRV, the CAL strain is endemic. To date, epidemics caused by rotavirus B have been confined to mainland China, and surveys indicate a lack of immunity to this species in the United States.

History

In 1943, Jacob Light and Horace Hodes proved that a filterable agent in the faeces of children with infectious diarrhoea also caused scours (livestock diarrhoea) in cattle. Three decades later, preserved samples of the agent were shown to be rotavirus. In the intervening years, a virus in mice was shown to be related to the virus causing scours. In 1973, Ruth Bishop and colleagues described related viruses found in children with gastroenteritis.

In 1974, Thomas Henry Flewett suggested the name rotavirus after observing that, when viewed through an electron microscope, a rotavirus particle looks like a wheel (rota in Latin); the name was officially recognised by the International Committee on Taxonomy of Viruses four years later. In 1976, related viruses were described in several other species of animals. These viruses, all causing acute gastroenteritis, were recognised as a collective pathogen affecting humans and animals worldwide. Rotavirus serotypes were first described in 1980, and in the following year, rotavirus from humans was first grown in cell cultures derived from monkey kidneys, by adding trypsin (an enzyme found in the duodenum of mammals and now known to be essential for rotavirus to replicate) to the culture medium. The ability to grow rotavirus in culture accelerated the pace of research, and by the mid-1980s the first candidate vaccines were being evaluated.

In 1998, a rotavirus vaccine was licensed for use in the United States. Clinical trials in the United States, Finland, and Venezuela had found it to be 80 to 100% effective at preventing severe diarrhoea caused by rotavirus A, and researchers had detected no statistically significant serious adverse effects. The manufacturer, however, withdrew it from the market in 1999, after it was discovered that the vaccine may have contributed to an increased risk for intussusception, a type of bowel obstruction, in one of every 12,000 vaccinated infants. The experience provoked intense debate about the relative risks and benefits of a rotavirus vaccine.
In 2006, two new vaccines against  infection were shown to be safe and effective in children, and in June 2009  the World Health Organization recommended that rotavirus vaccination be included in all national immunisation programmes to provide protection against this virus.

Other animals
Rotaviruses infect the young of many species of animals and they are a major cause of diarrhoea in wild and reared animals worldwide. As a pathogen of livestock, notably in young calves and piglets, rotaviruses cause  economic loss to farmers because of costs of treatment associated with high morbidity and mortality rates. These rotaviruses are a potential reservoir for genetic exchange with human rotaviruses. There is evidence that animal rotaviruses can infect humans, either by direct transmission of the virus or by contributing one or several RNA segments to reassortants with human strains.

References

Further reading

External links 
 WHO Rotavirus web page
 CDC About Rotavirus

Rotaviruses
Pediatrics
Viral diseases
Gastroenterology
Vaccine-preventable diseases
Bovine diseases
Poultry diseases
Swine diseases